The 2014 Road to the Kentucky Oaks was a points system by which three-year-old fillies qualified for the 2014 Kentucky Oaks. The point system replaced a previous qualifying system which was based on graded stakes earnings.

The number of races was originally reduced to 29 for the 2014 season (15 prep races and 14 championship season races). Due to a scheduling change of Las Virgenes, the Santa Ysabel replaced its spot in the first leg of the Kentucky Oaks Championship Series.  The Las Virgenes was then added as a Kentucky Oaks Prep Season race bringing the total number of races in the entire series to 30.

Untapable was both the leading qualifier for and winner of the 2014 Oaks. Untapable earned a total of 160 points by winning the Pocahontas (10 points), Rachel Alexandra (50 points) and Fair Grounds Oaks (100 points).

Standings

Prep Season races

Championship Series races

Notes

References

Kentucky Oaks
Road to the Kentucky Oaks
Road to the Kentucky Oaks